Newcomb Clark (September 23, 1840 – 1913) was the Speaker of the Michigan House of Representatives from 1885 to 1886.

Early life 
Clark was born in Sullivan County, New York on September 23, 1840. Around 1841, Clark moved to Oxford, Oakland County, Michigan.

Military career 
Clark taught in Port Gibson, Mississippi from 1857 to 1861. When the Civil War began, he escaped to the Union and joined the 14th Michigan Volunteer Infantry Regiment. In 1865, Clark was a Lieutenant Colonel.

Political career 
After the war, Clark held local offices. On January 3, 1883, Clark was sworn in as a member of the Michigan House of Representatives. In 1885, Clark became the Speaker of the Michigan House of Representatives. He died in Mississippi in 1913.

References 

1840 births
1913 deaths
Speakers of the Michigan House of Representatives
Republican Party members of the Michigan House of Representatives
Union Army colonels
People of Michigan in the American Civil War
19th-century American politicians